The Cathedral of the Most Holy Conception (in Spanish: Catedral de la Santísima Concepción) is a Roman Catholic cathedral located in Concepción, Chile.

Gallery

See also 
Roman Catholic Archdiocese of Concepción
History of Concepción
Catholic University of the Most Holy Conception

External links 

Roman Catholic Archdiocese of Concepción website 
Catholic University of the Most Holy Conception website 
The Cathedral in gcatholic.org 

Buildings and structures in Biobío Region
Tourist attractions in Biobío Region
Roman Catholic cathedrals in Chile